Dragon's Kiss is the first studio album by guitarist Marty Friedman, released on August 8, 1988 through Shrapnel Records (United States) and Roadrunner Records (Europe).

Critical reception

In a contemporary review, Holger Stratmann of Rock Hard did not recommend the album, but considered it as "quite good" in mixing "speed and folkloric influences from his old days in  Hawaii" with "the typical and probably indispensable nature of the Shrapnel horde."

Andy Hinds of AllMusic considered Dragon's Kiss an excellent album, and wrote that it "may be the most definitive sampling of Friedman's talents available." Martin Popoff in his Collector's Guide to Heavy Metal described Dragon's Kiss as "a structured album of artful instrumental rock that kills all that came before" and "ushered in a new classy, mature era in shred records."

The album was re-released on CD in 1991.

Track listing

Personnel
Musicians
Marty Friedman – guitar, bass, keyboard
Jason Becker – additional guitar solos (tracks 1, 3, 6)
Deen Castronovo – drums
Maija – piano (track 1)

Production
Marty Friedman – producer
Dino Alden – engineering, mixing
George Horn – mastering at Fantasy Studios, Berkeley, California
Dave Stephens Graphics – graphic design
Pat Johnson Studios – photography
Ross Pelton – Deen Castronovo photo
Mike Varney – executive production

References

External links
In Review: Marty Friedman "Dragon's Kiss" at Guitar Nine Records

Marty Friedman albums
1988 debut albums
Shrapnel Records albums
Roadrunner Records albums
Albums produced by Mike Varney